Graham John Willey (19 July 1933 – 10 February 2021) was an Australian rules footballer who played with Essendon in the Victorian Football League (VFL).

Willey, who was a student at Scotch College, made his debut for Essendon in 1955, while on a permit from Redan. That year he won the best and fairest award in the Ballarat Football League. He joined the club full-time in 1956 and kicked 33 goals from 16 games, to top Essendon's goal-kicking.

His work as a metallurgist brought him to Broken Hill in 1957 and he played with the North Broken Hill Football Club until 1960. He coached South Broken Hill to a premiership in 1962.

References

External links
 
 

1933 births
2021 deaths
Australian rules footballers from Victoria (Australia)
Essendon Football Club players
Redan Football Club players
North Broken Hill Football Club players
People educated at Scotch College, Melbourne